Flying Stars may refer to:

Flying Stars, was the aerobatic team of Yugoslavia.
Flying Star Feng Shui, one of the techniques used in Feng shui.